Bawshar ( Bawšar) is one of the wilayats of Muscat, in northeastern Oman. The province borders wilayat Muttrah in the east and Muscat International Airport in the west, it overlooks the Sea of Oman from the north. It contains several archaeological sites and the Qurm Nature Reserve Ramsar site.

According to the 2010 National Census, the population of wilayat Bawshar was 192,235 spread over its 43 villages and towns. The most noteworthy of these are Al Khuwair, Sultan Qaboos City, Al Ghubra, Al Adheeba, Ghala, Al Sarooj, Bowsher Al Qadima, Al Ansab Sanab, Al Hamam, Al Awabi, and Al Misfah. One of the biggest supermarkets of Oman resides here which is Lulu Hypermarket. which is now merged with the Grand Mall Muscat.

Schools in Bawshar include:

 The International School of Oman

In conjunction with the Muscat Grand Mall, there are a number of other shopping malls in the area. These include:

 The Panorama Mall
 Avenues Mall 
 The Mall of Oman which has opened in September 2021 and is currently the largest Mall in Oman.

References

Further reading
Paul Yule ed., Studies in the Archaeology of the Sultanate of Oman, Deutsches Archäologisches Institut, Orient-Abteilung, Orient-Archäologie vol. 2, Rahden, 1999, pages 1–72.
Paul Yule Cross-roads – Early and Late Iron Age South-eastern Arabia, Abhandlungen Deutsche Orient-Gesellschaft, vol. 30, Wiesbaden 2014, 34-35 Fig 13.1

Populated places in the Muscat Governorate
Suburbs of Muscat, Oman